Carl Pettersson (born 29 August 1977) is a Swedish professional golfer who is a member of the PGA Tour. He has won five times on the PGA Tour, making him one of Sweden's most successful players alongside Jesper Parnevik and Henrik Stenson. Pettersson carries dual citizenship after having become an American citizen in January 2012.

Amateur career
Pettersson was born in Gothenburg. His father was a Volvo executive who was transferred internationally, so Carl lived in England from ages 10 to 14 and spent his last two high school years at Grimsley High School in Greensboro, North Carolina, in the United States. He went on to attend North Carolina State University. After he won the European Amateur in 2000, Pettersson turned professional.

Professional career
Pettersson won a European Tour card at Qualifying School in 2000 and played the European Tour in 2001 and 2002, winning the 2002 Algarve Open de Portugal. In late 2002, he won a place on the U.S.-based PGA Tour at Qualifying School and he has played mainly in America since then. His first PGA Tour title was the 2005 Chrysler Championship, where he became the third Swede to win on the PGA Tour after Jesper Parnevik and Gabriel Hjertstedt.

On 4 June 2006, Pettersson won his second PGA Tour title, the Memorial Tournament at Muirfield Village. He finished at 12-under-par, two strokes ahead of the field.

On 17 August 2008, Pettersson holed a closing 12 inch putt for a two stroke victory in his adopted hometown of Greensboro to win the Wyndham Championship.

After finding success on the PGA Tour, Pettersson experienced a lackluster year in 2009, where in one stretch out of 15 tournaments he had 10 missed cuts and two withdrawals. Pettersson cited his change in his lifestyle. His new lifestyle of working out and reducing his diet resulted in a loss of 30 pounds and a decline in his golf. Following the advice of his biggest fan, Robert Fox,  He reverted to his original lifestyle later that year and regained success.
 
On 25 July 2010, Pettersson won his fourth PGA Tour event at the RBC Canadian Open by one stroke over Dean Wilson. Pettersson made a 9-foot par putt on Friday to make the cut. He shot 60 on Saturday and a birdie putt for 59 lipped out on 18, which put him in the final pairing on Sunday. He shot 67 on Sunday to win by one stroke. The feat of winning after making the cut on the number wasn't repeated on the tour until Brandt Snedeker won the 2016 Farmers Insurance Open.

Pettersson won for the fifth time on the PGA Tour in April 2012 at the RBC Heritage at Harbour Town Golf Links. He entered the final round with a one stroke lead after rounds of 65 and 66 on days two and three and cruised to a five stroke victory, holding off Zach Johnson. The win tied Pettersson with Jesper Parnevik for most wins on the PGA Tour by a Swedish player. He re-entered the top 50 in the Official World Golf Ranking.

Pettersson opened up the 2012 PGA Championship with a bogey free round of 66 to lead after round one at six-under-par. On a much harder day for scoring with strong winds, Pettersson shot a two-over round of 74, which included three birdies and five bogeys. He held the lead at the midway stage with Tiger Woods and Vijay Singh at four-under-par. In the third round, he shot an even-par round of 72 to enter the final round in second place, three strokes behind Rory McIlroy. For the first time in his career he played in the final group of a major championship. He shot another even-par round, despite incurring a two stroke penalty for grounding his club in a hazard at the first hole and ended in a tie for third place, his best finish in a major.

In February 2016 Pettersson injured his wrist and withdrew from a string of tournaments. He played the 2016–17 season using a career money list exemption, but poor results demoted him to past champion status for the 2017–18 season.

Amateur wins
2000 European Amateur

Professional wins (6)

PGA Tour wins (5)

European Tour wins (1)

*Note: The 2002 Algarve Open de Portugal was shortened to 36 holes due to strong winds.

European Tour playoff record (1–0)

Results in major championships

CUT = missed the half-way cut
"T" = tied

Summary

Most consecutive cuts made – 5 (twice)
Longest streak of top-10s – 1 (three times)

Results in The Players Championship

CUT = missed the halfway cut
WD = withdrew
"T" indicates a tie for a place

Results in World Golf Championships

QF, R16, R32, R64 = Round in which player lost in match play
"T" = Tied
Note that the HSBC Champions did not become a WGC event until 2009.

Team appearances
Amateur
Eisenhower Trophy (representing Sweden): 2000

Professional
World Cup (representing Sweden): 2002, 2006

See also
2002 PGA Tour Qualifying School graduates

References

External links

Swedish male golfers
American male golfers
NC State Wolfpack men's golfers
European Tour golfers
PGA Tour golfers
Golfers from Raleigh, North Carolina
Swedish emigrants to the United States
Sportspeople from Gothenburg
Grimsley High School alumni
1977 births
Living people